Qaleh-ye Golab, also rendered as Qaleh-i-Gulab, may refer to:
 Qaleh-ye Golab, Kerman
 Qaleh-ye Golab, Kohgiluyeh and Boyer-Ahmad